was a village in Santō District, Niigata, Japan.

As of 2003, the village had an estimated population of 4,814 and a population density of 151.10 persons per km². The total area was 31.86 km².

On January 1, 2006, Washima, along with the city of Tochio, and the towns of Teradomari and Yoita (all from Santō District), was merged into the expanded city of Nagaoka.

Transportation

Railway
 JR East - Echigo Line
  -

Highway
 

Dissolved municipalities of Niigata Prefecture
Nagaoka, Niigata